Frenship Independent School District is a public school district based in Wolfforth, Texas, United States.

In addition to Wolfforth, the district serves western portions of Lubbock and southwestern Lubbock County. A small part of Hockley County also lies within the district. About 9,400 students are enrolled at Frenship ISD.

In 2009, the school district was rated "academically acceptable" by the Texas Education Agency.

Schools
Frenship ISD has 14 schools; four schools are located in Wolfforth, nine are in the city of Lubbock, and one is in Lubbock County.

High schools (grades 9-12)
Frenship High School (Wolfforth)
 Frenship 9th Grade Center (Wolfforth[)
Reese Education Center (Lubbock)

Middle schools (grades 6-8)
Frenship Middle School (Wolfforth)
Heritage Middle School (Lubbock)
Terra Vista Middle School (Lubbock)
Alcove Trails Middle School (In construction) (Lubbock)

Elementary schools (prekindergarten-grade 5)
Bennett Elementary School (Wolfforth)
Crestview Elementary School (Lubbock)
Legacy Elementary School (Lubbock)
North Ridge Elementary School (Lubbock)
Oak Ridge Elementary School (Lubbock)
Upland Heights Elementary School (Lubbock)
Westwind Elementary School (Lubbock)
Willow Bend Elementary School (Lubbock)

Notable students
William John Cox (Billy Jack Cox), public interest attorney, author, and political activist; attended 1946-1956

References

External links
Frenship ISD

 
School districts in Lubbock County, Texas
School districts in Hockley County, Texas
School districts established in 1935